Marystown may refer to:

Places
 Marystown, Burin Peninsula, Island of Newfoundland, Newfoundland and Labrador, Canada
 Marystown, Minnesota, USA, an unincorporated community in Louisville Township, Scott County
 Marystown, Texas, USA, an unincorporated community in Johnson County, Texas
 Marystown, a townland of County Roscommon, Ireland

Other uses
 Marystown Central High School, Marystown, NL, Canada
 Marystown Group, a Neoproterozoic stratigraphic group

See also

 
 Maryton (disambiguation)
 Marytown (disambiguation)
 Marysville (disambiguation)
 Maryville (disambiguation)
 Ville-Marie (disambiguation)
 Villa Maria (disambiguation)
 Town (disambiguation)
 Mary (disambiguation)